Shanghai West Railway Station, formerly known as West Shanghai Railway Station (2009-2020), is an interchange station between Line 11 and Line 15 of the Shanghai Metro. Located adjacent to the Shanghai West railway station in Shanghai's Putuo District, line 11 opened on 31 December 2009 and it became an interchange station with the opening of line 15 on 23 January 2021.

Station Layout

References

Shanghai Metro stations in Putuo District
Railway stations in China opened in 2009
Railway stations in Shanghai
Line 11, Shanghai Metro